

About 

Born in 1903, Bimal Mukherjee (1903–1996) was the first Indian globe trotter to travel the entire world on a bicycle from the year 1926 to 1937. Though born in Odisha his ancestral house was at Pataldanga street, Kolkata, West Bengal.

The Voyage 
Bimal Mukherjee (1903–1996) was the first Indian globe trotter who travelled the entire world on a bicycle from the year 1926 to 1937. He wrote the book Du Chakay Duniya about his experiences.

The world voyage started on bicycle from Town Hall, Calcutta on 12 December 1926 and halted at Chandannagar for the first night.

He and his three friends Ashok Mukherjee, Ananda Mukherjee and Manindra Ghosh had crossed the Bohemian Alps in bicycles wearing flannel shirts and no woolen clothing in the month of December. They had kept warm by cycling vigorously and alternated keeping one hand in their pockets to prevent frostbite. When asked how they did the amazing feat. He had replied, "We are carrying the sun rays from India!".

See also
 Ramnath Biswas
 Rajesh Chandrasekar
 Chandan Biswas

References

1903 births
1987 deaths
Circumnavigators of the globe
Indian explorers
Indian male cyclists
Indian travel writers